Pavel Gayduk (born 11 February 1976) is a Kazakhstani ski jumper. He competed at the 1998 Winter Olympics and the 2002 Winter Olympics.

References

External links
 

1976 births
Living people
Kazakhstani male ski jumpers
Olympic ski jumpers of Kazakhstan
Ski jumpers at the 1998 Winter Olympics
Ski jumpers at the 2002 Winter Olympics
Sportspeople from Almaty
Asian Games medalists in ski jumping
Ski jumpers at the 2003 Asian Winter Games
Asian Games bronze medalists for Kazakhstan
Medalists at the 2003 Asian Winter Games
20th-century Kazakhstani people
21st-century Kazakhstani people